Kenton  was a railway station on the Mid-Suffolk Light Railway. The station was located a mile north of the hamlet of Kenton.

History

This station had been intended to be the junction for the proposed branch to Westerfield, but this line was only  in length before construction ceased on the outskirts of Debenham.

As well as having the double-ended corrugated station building with open fronted waiting room that were standard on the Mid-Suffolk, Kenton acted as a half-way point on the railway and had a second platform and engine shed.

After the line closed, the station site became an industrial estate.

The station's running-in board and a "Kenton" station sign are preserved in the National Railway Museum, York, as is the Kenton - Laxfield train staff.

References 

Comfort, N. A. (1986) The Mid-Suffolk Light Railway, The Oakwood Press. 
Paye, P. (1986) The Mid-Suffolk Light Railway, Wild Swan Publications Ltd. 

Disused railway stations in Suffolk
Former Mid-Suffolk Light Railway stations
Railway stations in Great Britain opened in 1908
Railway stations in Great Britain closed in 1952
1908 establishments in England